Jim Bohlen (July 4, 1926 – July 5, 2010) was an American engineer and activist who worked as part of the Atlas ICBM missile program and went on to be one of the founders of Greenpeace.

Bibliography
 Jim Bohlen, (2000). Making Waves: The Origin and Future of Greenpeace, Black Rose Books. 
 James Bohlen, (1975). New Pioneer's Handbook: Getting Back to the Land in an Energy-Scarce World, Schocken.

References

External links
 "Jim Bohlen 1926 – 2010," Greenpeace International, Tuesday, July 6, 2010.
 Grimes, William. "Jim Bohlen, Led in Creation of Greenpeace, Dies at 84," The New York Times, Thursday, July 8, 2010.
 Mackie, John. "Greenpeace pioneer Jim Bohlen dead at 84," The Vancouver Sun, Friday, July 9, 2010.

American Quakers
Canadian environmentalists
Green Party of British Columbia politicians
American emigrants to Canada
1926 births
2010 deaths
Green Party of Canada candidates in the 1988 Canadian federal election
American anti–nuclear weapons activists
Canadian anti–nuclear weapons activists
People associated with Greenpeace